Seboeis Plantation is a plantation in Penobscot County, Maine, United States. The population was 40 at the 2020 census.

History
Seboeis is a name derived from the Penobscot language meaning "brook or small stream".

Geography

Demographics

At the 2000 census there were 41 people, 17 households, and 13 families living in the plantation. The population density was 1.0 people per square mile (0.4/km). There were 58 housing units at an average density of 1.4 per square mile (0.6/km).  The racial makeup of the plantation was 100.00% White.
Of the 17 households 11.8% had children under the age of 18 living with them, 52.9% were married couples living together, 23.5% had a female householder with no husband present, and 23.5% were non-families. 23.5% of households were one person and 11.8% were one person aged 65 or older. The average household size was 2.41 and the average family size was 2.77.

The age distribution was 22.0% under the age of 18, 2.4% from 18 to 24, 19.5% from 25 to 44, 31.7% from 45 to 64, and 24.4% 65 or older. The median age was 47 years. For every 100 females, there were 86.4 males. For every 100 females age 18 and over, there were 77.8 males.

The median household income was $38,750 and the median family income  was $46,250. Males had a median income of $45,625 versus $0 for females. The per capita income for the plantation was $14,703. There are 8.3% of families living below the poverty line and 20.0% of the population, including 66.7% of under eighteens and none of those over 64.

References

Plantations in Penobscot County, Maine
Plantations in Maine